In statistics, the coefficient of multiple correlation is a measure of how well a given variable can be predicted using a linear function of a set of other variables. It is the correlation between the variable's values and the best predictions that can be computed linearly from the predictive variables.

The coefficient of multiple correlation takes values between 0 and 1. Higher values indicate higher predictability of the dependent variable from the independent variables, with a value of 1 indicating that the predictions are exactly correct and a value of 0 indicating that no linear combination of the independent variables is a better predictor than is the fixed mean of the dependent variable.

The coefficient of multiple correlation is known as the square root of the coefficient of determination, but under the particular assumptions that an intercept is included and that the best possible linear predictors are used, whereas the coefficient of determination is defined for more general cases, including those of nonlinear prediction and those in which the predicted values have not been derived from a model-fitting procedure.

Definition
The coefficient of multiple correlation, denoted R, is a scalar that is defined as the Pearson correlation coefficient between the predicted and the actual values of the dependent variable in a linear regression model that includes an intercept.

Computation

The square of the coefficient of multiple correlation can be computed using the vector  of correlations  between the predictor variables  (independent variables) and the target variable  (dependent variable), and the correlation matrix  of correlations between predictor variables. It is given by

If all the predictor variables are uncorrelated, the matrix  is the identity matrix and  simply equals , the sum of the squared correlations with the dependent variable.  If the predictor variables are correlated among themselves, the inverse of the correlation matrix  accounts for this.

The squared coefficient of multiple correlation can also be computed as the fraction of variance of the dependent variable that is explained by the independent variables, which in turn is 1 minus the unexplained fraction. The unexplained fraction can be computed as the sum of squares of residuals—that is, the sum of the squares of the prediction errors—divided by the sum of squares of deviations of the values of the dependent variable from its expected value.

Properties

References

Further reading
 Allison, Paul D. (1998). Multiple Regression: A Primer. London: Sage Publications. 
 Cohen, Jacob, et al. (2002). Applied Multiple Regression: Correlation Analysis for the Behavioral Sciences. 
 Crown, William H. (1998). Statistical Models for the Social and Behavioral Sciences: Multiple Regression and Limited-Dependent Variable Models. 
 Edwards, Allen Louis (1985). Multiple Regression and the Analysis of Variance and Covariance. 
 Keith, Timothy (2006). Multiple Regression and Beyond. Boston: Pearson Education.
 Fred N. Kerlinger, Elazar J. Pedhazur (1973). Multiple Regression in Behavioral Research. New York: Holt Rinehart Winston. 
 Stanton, Jeffrey M. (2001). "Galton, Pearson, and the Peas: A Brief History of Linear Regression for Statistics Instructors", Journal of Statistics Education, 9 (3).

Correlation indicators
Regression analysis